Héctor Anibal Maestri Garcia (April 19, 1935 – February 21, 2014) was a Cuban-born Major League Baseball pitcher. Maestri was one of nine ballplayers to have appeared for both of the 20th century, American League Washington Senators franchises, and one of only three to have played for them in consecutive seasons. (Hal Woodeshick and Rudy Hernández are the others.) In another oddity, he pitched in only one game for each franchise.

In 1956, the right-hander was signed by the Washington Senators of 1901–60; four years later, when the "original" Senators moved to Minneapolis–St. Paul as the Minnesota Twins, he was selected by the Twins' successors in Washington, the expansion Senators of 1961–71, in the 1960 expansion lottery.

His lone appearance for the earlier Senators, during their final days in the U.S. capital, saw him hurl two scoreless innings of relief against the Baltimore Orioles on September 24, 1960, at Griffith Stadium. Almost a full year later, on September 17, 1961, he appeared in his second and last MLB game for the expansion Washington club, starting and pitching six innings against the Kansas City Athletics, also at Griffith Stadium. He gave up three runs (just one earned) and took the loss in a 3–2 game.

Maestri's two-game career totals were 8 innings pitched, seven hits and three bases on balls allowed, three strikeouts, a 0–1 record, and a 1.13 ERA.

Maestri had an eight-year (1957–1962; 1965–1966) minor league career. He died in 2014, aged 78, in Miami.

External links

Retrosheet
Venezuelan Professional Baseball League
Hector Maestri, Cuban pitcher for both Washington Senators teams, dies at 78

1935 births
2014 deaths
Charlotte Hornets (baseball) players
Cienfuegos players
Columbia Reds players
Elmira Pioneers players
Fort Walton Beach Jets players
Fox Cities Foxes players
Jersey City Jerseys players
Major League Baseball pitchers
Major League Baseball players from Cuba
Cuban expatriate baseball players in the United States
Mexican League baseball players
Rojos del Águila de Veracruz players
Baseball players from Havana
Syracuse Chiefs players
Tigres de Aragua players
Toronto Maple Leafs (International League) players
Washington Senators (1901–1960) players
Washington Senators (1961–1971) players
Wilson Tobs players